William Davidge may refer to:
 William Pleater Davidge, English comedian
 William Robert Davidge, British architect and surveyor

See also 
 William Davidge Page (died 1939), British geologist, chemist, mining engineer and publisher